Zgornja Radovna is a dispersed settlement in the Municipality of Kranjska Gora, northwestern Slovenia, belonging to the traditional region of Upper Carniola. The village lies at the juncture of the Kot Valley and the northern part of the Krma Valley (i.e., the Lower Krma Valley). The Radovna River, a tributary of the Sava Dolinka, emerges under the Jutrova Skala Slope in the northeastern part of the settlement.

Pocar Farm

The Pocar Farm in Zgornja Radovna has one of the oldest traditional farmhouses in Triglav National Park, with the year 1775 engraved on one of its beams and a written attestation from 1672. It is one of the best-preserved examples of traditional 18th-century Alpine architecture and has been protected as a cultural monument of national significance. The farm now hosts an ethnographic museum and an information point for Triglav National Park.

References

External links

Zgornja Radovna on Geopedia

Populated places in the Municipality of Kranjska Gora